Roger S. Pulwarty is a scientist from Trinidad and Tobago and contributed to the work of the Intergovernmental Panel on Climate Change (IPCC). Pulwarty is the Senior Scientist in the National Oceanic and Atmospheric Administration (NOAA) Physical Sciences Laboratory in Boulder, Colorado. 

Roger Pulwarty earned a B.S. degree (Hons.) in Atmospheric Sciences from York University in Toronto in 1986 and a Ph.D. in Climatology from the University of Colorado at Boulder in 1994, where he worked under Professors Roger Barry and Herbert Riehl. His research and publications are on weather, water and climate, impacts and adaptation in the U.S., Latin America and the Caribbean. From 1998-2002 he was the program director of the NOAA Regional Integrated Sciences and Assessments, and from 2007-2016 he directed the U.S. National Integrated Drought Information System. Pulwarty is Professor Adjunct at the University of Colorado at Boulder and the University of the West Indies.

Pulwarty is a convening lead author on the 2014 IPCC Working Group II on Impacts, Adaptation and Vulnerability, lead author on the 2007 IPCC Working Group II, on the IPCC 2008 Technical Report on Climate Change and Water and the 2012 Special Report on Extremes, the UN Office for Disaster Risk Reduction Global Assessment Reports, the UN Convention to Combat Desertification, and on National Assessments of the US Global Change Research Program. The IPCC is an intergovernmental body mandated by the UN to study the origins and effects of climate change on society and ecosystems. Pulwarty has served on Committees of the U.S. National Academy of Sciences and the World Meteorological Organization, among others, and has provided testimonies before the U.S. Congress on climate, water resources and adaptation. Pulwarty acts in advisory roles on weather and climate, natural resources, and disaster risk management to several U.S. and international interests including the Western Governors Association, the Department of the Interior, the governments of CARICOM (the Caribbean Economic Community), the Organization of American States, the UNDP, UNEP and the World and InterAmerican Development Banks. He is a Fellow of the American Meteorological Society, recipient of the American Geophysical Union Gilbert F. White Award, and the Trinidad and Tobago National Institute for Higher Education Research, Science, and Technology Gold Medal.

References

External links
 Roger Pulwarty: NOAA Physical Sciences Laboratory

Year of birth missing (living people)
Living people
York University alumni
National Oceanic and Atmospheric Administration personnel